The Westminster Budget was a British national newspaper from 1893 to 1904. Copies of the paper are available in the British Library newspaper collection under shelf mark MLD29.

Arthur Rackham worked for the paper from 1892 as a reporter and illustrator.

References

1893 establishments in the United Kingdom
1904 disestablishments in the United Kingdom
Newspapers published in London